Howard W. Fletcher (March 13, 1913 – August 23, 2001) was an American football player and coach.  He served as the head football coach at the Northern Illinois University from 1956 to 1968, compiling a record of 74–48–1.  Fletcher's Northern Illinois Huskies squad was named the NCAA College Division Champion by the Associated Press in 1963.  He led the Huskies to three consecutive Interstate Intercollegiate Athletic Conference (IIAC) championships, in 1963, 1964, and 1965.  The Huskies also won the Mineral Water Bowl in 1963.

Head coaching record

College

References

1913 births
2001 deaths
American football tackles
Northern Illinois Huskies football coaches
Northern Illinois Huskies football players
High school football coaches in Illinois
High school football coaches in Ohio
People from Streator, Illinois
Players of American football from Illinois